Should've Been You may refer to:

 "It Should've Been You", song by Teddy Pendergrass
 "Should've Been You", song by Imelda May from Life Love Flesh Blood
 It Shoulda Been You, 2015 Broadway musical